Mont à Cavouère is a mountain of the western Bernese Alps, located near Derborence in the canton of Valais. It lies north of the Haut de Cry.

References

External links
 Mont à Cavouère on Hikr

Mountains of the Alps
Mountains of Valais
Mountains of Switzerland
Two-thousanders of Switzerland